Joker(s) or The Joker(s) may refer to:

 Joker (playing card)
 Jester, a person employed to tell jokes and provide entertainment

Fictional characters

Print
 Joker (character), a DC Comics character
 The Joker (comic book)
 Joker (graphic novel)
 Joker (Jack Napier), the character as he appears in the 1989 film Batman
 Joker (The Dark Knight), the character as he appears in the 2008 film The Dark Knight
 Joker (comic strip), a comic strip in the British anthology comics
 Joker (Flame of Recca), from the Japanese manga series Flame of Recca
 Mr. Joker, or Joe Carpenter, in Read or Die
 Joker (Wild Cards), a person with a harmful mutation in Wild Cards
 Jokers, a race of super-beings in Terry Pratchett's novel The Dark Side of the Sun
 James T. "Joker" Davis, protagonist of the novel The Short-Timers
 Joker, a character from Black Butler: Book of Circus
 Joker, the underground alias of Donquixote Doflamingo, a pirate from One Piece

Film and television
 Kamen Rider Chalice, or Joker, from Kamen Rider Blade
 Kamen Rider Joker, a rider form of Shotaro Hidari, from Kamen Rider W Forever: A to Z/The Gaia Memories of Fate
 Joker, from J.A.K.Q. Dengekitai
 James T. "Joker" Davis, in Full Metal Jacket
 Impractical Jokers, also called Jokers, American cringe comedy show

Video games
 Joker (Persona), from Persona 5
 Joker (Mass Effect), from Mass Effect
 Joker, a character from the Monster Rancher series
 The Joker, from Fighters Destiny
 Joker (Suikoden), from Suikoden III
 The Joker, from SaGa Frontier
 Joker, from Alice in the Country of Hearts
 Joker, a character from Call of Duty: Advanced Warfare

People
 Joker (nickname), includes a list of people with the nickname
 Joker (wrestler) (William Posada, born 1983), American professional wrestler

Musicians
 Joker (musician) (Liam McLean, born 1989), English dubstep artist
 Jonas Berggren or Joker (born 1967), Swedish musician and record producer
 Jokeren or The Joker (Jesper Dahl, born 1973), Danish rapper

Film
 The Joker (1928 film), a Danish-German silent drama film
 The Joker (1960 film), a French comedy by Philippe de Broca
 The Jokers, a 1967 British comedy starring Michael Crawford and Oliver Reed
 The Joker (1987 film) or Lethal Obsession, a German crime-thriller film
 Joker (1993 film), an Indian Telugu comedy film produced by P. Pattabhi Rama Rao
 Joker (2000 film), an Indian Malayalam film by A. K. Lohithadas
 Joker (2012 film), an Indian Hindi film starring Akshay Kumar
 The Joker (2014 film) or Poker Night, an American-Canadian crime thriller by Greg Francis
 Joker (2016 film), an Indian Tamil film by Raju Murugan
 Joker (2019 film), an American film starring Joaquin Phoenix

Literature
 Joker (American magazine)
 Joker (Slovenian magazine)

Music

Albums
 The Joker (album), a 1973 album by the Steve Miller Band
Joker, an album by Mirkelam

Songs
 "The Joker (That's What They Call Me)", a 1957 song by Billy Myles
 "The Joker" (Anthony Newley song), from the musical The Roar of the Greasepaint – The Smell of the Crowd (1964)
 "Joker" (Anna Rossinelli song) (2011)
 "The Joker" (Steve Miller Band song) (1973)
 "The Joker", a 1988 song by Quiet Riot from QR
 "Joker", a 1991 song by X Japan from Jealousy
 "The Joker", a 2010 song by Zona B

Roller coasters
 The Joker (Six Flags México)
 The Joker (Six Flags Discovery Kingdom)
 The Joker (S&S Worldwide)

Science
 Joker butterfly (Byblia ilithyia)
 Common joker butterfly (Byblia anvatara)
 Byblia or jokers, a genus of brush-footed butterflies
 Joker moth (Feralia jocosa)
 Loureedia phoenixi, the Joker spider

Sports
 Helsingin Jokerit or Jokers, a Finnish ice hockey team
 FC Jokerit, a Finnish association football club
 Jokerit FC (2012)
 Jokers de Cergy-Pontoise, a French ice hockey team
 KK Joker, a Serbian basketball club
 Team Joker, a Norwegian cycling team

Television
 Joker, a pricing game on the game show The Price Is Right
 Joker, a wild card for players of the TV quiz show The Joker's Wild

Transportation
 FreeX Joker, a German paraglider design
 Honda Joker, a scooter made from 1996 to 1999
 Peña Joker, a French amateur-built aircraft design
 Joker, an edition of the Volkswagen Golf Mk3
 Joker, an edition of the Volkswagen Westfalia Camper

Other uses
 Joker (store), a Norwegian convenience store chain
 Joker, West Virginia, an unincorporated community
 Jokers, nickname of VF-20, a World War II US Navy squadron

See also

 Joker! Joker!! Joker!!!, a U.S. TV gameshow
 Comedian (disambiguation)
 Comic (disambiguation)
 Dzhokhar (disambiguation)
 Impractical Joker (disambiguation)
 Jokester (disambiguation)
 Jester (disambiguation)
 Joke (disambiguation)
 Practical joker (disambiguation)